Daniel Valter Rogelim (born October 13, 1972) is a Brazilian professional racing cyclist for the Scott–Marcondes Cesar–São José dos Campos team.

Career highlights

1996 –
 1st overall GC – Tour de Santa Catarina (BRA)
1999 –
 1st overall GC – Tour de Santa Catarina (BRA)
 1st overall Mountains Classification – Vuelta Ciclista de Chile (BRA)
2000 –
 2nd – National Road Championship, Elite Men (BRA)
2001 –
  National Road Championship, Elite Men (BRA)
2002 –
 1st overall GC – Volta do Rio de Janeiro (BRA)
2006 – Memorial-Santos
 Stage 4 and 11 wins – Tour de Santa Catarina (BRA)
2007 – Scott–Marcondes Cesar–São José dos Campos
 Stage 1 – Tour de Santa Catarina (BRA)
2008 – Scott–Marcondes Cesar–São José dos Campos
 1st overall – Torneio de Verão (BRA)

External links

1972 births
Living people
Brazilian male cyclists
Brazilian road racing cyclists
Cyclists at the 1996 Summer Olympics
Cyclists at the 1999 Pan American Games
Olympic cyclists of Brazil
Sportspeople from Santa Catarina (state)
Pan American Games competitors for Brazil
20th-century Brazilian people
21st-century Brazilian people